Arthdal Chronicles is a 2019 South Korean television series written by Kim Young-hyun and Park Sang-yeon and directed by Kim Won-seok, under the production banner of Studio Dragon and KPJ, starring Jang Dong-gun, Song Joong-ki, Kim Ji-won, and Kim Ok-vin. Regarded as the first Korean ancient fantasy drama, the story takes place during the Bronze Age and is loosely based on the story of Dangun, the founder of the first Korean Kingdom of Gojoseon. The series aired on tvN from June 1 to September 22, 2019, on Saturdays and Sundays at 21:00 (KST) for 18 episodes. It premiered internationally on Netflix.

In spite of the generally mixed to negative reception from critics, the series was the sixth most preferred Korean drama among viewers in the United States market in 2019 as per Consumer Research Report by the Korea Creative Content Agency.

Synopsis
In a mythical land called Arth, the inhabitants of the ancient city of Arthdal contend with power struggles, while some encounter love along the way. Eun-seom goes through hardships to bring his tribe back to life and learns of his true origins in the process.

Cast and characters

 Jang Dong-gun as Ta-gon
 Song Joong-ki (season 1) and Lee Joon-gi (season 2) as Eun-seom and Saya
 Kim Ji-won (season 1) and Shin Se-kyung (season 2) as Tan-ya
 Kim Ok-vin as Tae Al-ha

Production

Season 1
The cast and crew attended a workshop in Yangju, Gyeonggi-do, on August 21, 2018. The first script reading was held on August 26, 2018. Filming officially started on December 5, 2018 with the opening ceremony of the set in Osan, whose construction took place for eight months. The drama was also filmed overseas in Brunei, with Song Joong-ki departing first on February 24, 2019.

The drama serves as a reunion project for Song Joong-ki and Kim Ji-won who both starred in the 2016 hit drama Descendants of the Sun.

Season 2
On February 12, 2020, it was announced that the drama was renewed for a second season. On June 11, 2020, it was announced that the production schedule was postponed due to the COVID-19 pandemic and has been excluded from the 2021 lineup.

In February 2022, it was announced that the second season was expected to be released in early 2023 along with a webtoon and an MMORPG. Writers Kim Young-hyun and Park Sang-yeon will be in charge of the script again, while it will be directed by Kim Kwang-sik. Set more than a decade later, Lee Joon-gi and Shin Se-kyung will replace Song Joong-ki and Kim Ji-won as the adult versions of Eun-seom and Tan-ya, while Jang Dong-gun and Kim Ok-vin will reprise their roles. Filming began on August 23, 2022.

Reception

Critical reception
The drama received mixed reviews. It was criticized by Game of Thrones fans for sharing similarities with that series, while critics felt that it employs poor use of CGI, has a formulaic plot, is similar to other foreign fantasy dramas and films centered on ancient times, and has a slow-paced storyline, which can make viewers lose interest. Viewers were also bewildered by the historical setting, as the drama is set in the Bronze Age but cast members are seen wearing armors and weapons that do not belong to that era.

Conversely, the drama was praised for its intriguing storyline and unique setting, touching on subjects like the meaning of a tribe, an alliance and a nation, as well as religion. Writer Park Sang-yeon said, "I wouldn't even think of comparing our series to [Game of Thrones] and I don't think our goal is to create something similar... I wouldn't try to claim to do anything similar to the show and I don't think it's an appropriate comparison." He added, "We tried to create a great series by building a fictitious world of our own with our imagination and I hope you see our series as it is."

Although John Serba of Decider.com gave the series a "Skip It" rating, he said, "Arthdal occurs in a more primitive time than [Game of Thrones], and appears to be set up to explore different ideas about the human creature and its thirst for power and possessions." He said that the show further differentiates itself from Game of Thrones by its absence of nudity and sex scenes. Forbes contributor Joan MacDonald said, "Stunning camera work makes The Arthdal Chronicles a visual pleasure to watch, capturing sweeping panoramas that place fledgeling humans in the context of a wide world waiting to be explored—and possibly conquered."

The series received lower-than-expected viewership ratings, in comparison to its massive budget, but the first episode received ratings of 6.7 percent and peaked at 8 percent, placing it first for all dramas in its time slot, including non-cable broadcasting stations. It achieved a ratings high on June 9, with its fourth episode, scoring an average rating of 7.7 percent nationwide, which was an increase of 1.3 percent from the night before. The episode peaked at 8.9 percent nationwide.

Staff mistreatment
The production team was criticized for mistreatment of its production staff. The production team was accused of violating labor laws from local civic groups, including the Seoul-based Hanbit Media Labor Rights Center and Hope Solidarity Labor Union, as the drama crew had been subject to a "murderous" working environment that made them work up to 150 hours a week. The organizations reported Studio Dragon to the Seoul Employment and Labor Administration. The standards were agreed upon and announced by the studio last September to enhance the labor environment of its staff.

Studio Dragon responded to the allegations, saying they abided by its own labor rules, but admitted that they had filmed for 113 hours during the week they went to Brunei in order to make the most out of their time shooting overseas. The studio denied reports that an injured staff member was ignored and told to continue working.

Original soundtrack

Part 1

Part 2

Special OST

Viewership
Arthdal Chronicles aired on tvN,  a cable channel/pay TV, which normally has a relatively smaller audience compared to free-to-air TV/public broadcasters (KBS, SBS, MBC and EBS). The first episode recorded average ratings of 6.7% and peaked at 8%, taking first place for all dramas in its time slot, including non-cable broadcasting stations. The drama's personal record of 7.7% was on its fourth episode. Its finale scored an average rating of 7.4% nationwide. The series entered the list of highest-rated Korean dramas in cable television.

Awards and nominations

References

External links
  
 
 

TVN (South Korean TV channel) television dramas
2019 South Korean television series debuts
South Korean historical television series
South Korean fantasy television series
Alternate history television series
South Korean pre-produced television series
Television series by Studio Dragon
Korean-language Netflix exclusive international distribution programming